The S. H. Kress and Co. Building is a historic 1928 building in Tampa, Florida, United States. It was part of the S. H. Kress & Co. "five and dime" department store chain. The store closed in 1981, and has since remained vacant. on April 7, 1983, it was added to the U.S. National Register of Historic Places.

Located at 811 N. Franklin Street, the building has a second fronting on Florida Avenue and is in the Renaissance Revival architectural style. G.E. Mackey was the four story building's architect, and it includes masonry, suspended bronze marquee, extensive use of terra-cotta ornamentation (on both of its facades). It was "one of the last major commercial structures built in Tampa before the Great Depression".

The Kress building is located between former Woolworth and J.J. Newberry stores, although the block is commonly known as the "Kress block." Lunch-counter sit-ins and protests at the block were held by civil rights activists at the Woolworth store in the 1960s to protest segregated lunch counters in Tampa. Today, there is a historical marker commemorating the movement.

Attempts at Redevelopment 

Redevelopment plans for the Kress and the surrounding block date to at least 1987. Richard Wellhouse Stein planned to renovate the nearby structures to match the Kress façade, and add a nine-story atrium house nearly 200,000 square feet of office space.

Plans by the Doran Jason Group to demolish two of the buildings and replace them with a "massive" condo development were held off in 2006. The Kress building would have been used as a lobby with office and retail space.

In 2011, a fundraiser at the Kress building was cancelled due to the dispute over redevelopment plans.

The building was planned for social gatherings during the 2012 Republican Convention in Tampa, although the RNC kept details about the gathering secret.

In 2014, plans for renovation and a 24-story addition and conversion of the block into a hotel were proposed, then scrapped.

The block, including the Kress building, was purchased in 2017 by the Wilson Company, a Tampa-based property management firm. Statements at the time of purchase indicate plans to preserve, renovate, and redevelop the block.

Gallery

References

Additional sources and external links

 Hillsborough County listings at National Register of Historic Places
 Florida's Office of Cultural and Historical Programs
 Hillsborough County listings at Florida's Office of Cultural and Historical Programs
 Kress Building
 Tampa's Kress building history

National Register of Historic Places in Tampa, Florida
Commercial buildings completed in 1929
S. H. Kress & Co.